Āpiti is a small township in the North Island of New Zealand. It is located to the northeast of the small town of Kimbolton in the Manawatū-Whanganui region. It is located on a small plain, the Apiti Flats, close to the valley and gorge of the Oroua River, near Rangiwahia and close to the foot of the Ruahine Range.

Āpiti was settled in 1886 and has a population of 226. Although its industry has historically always been pastoral farming, it is now also known by tourists and trampers as a gateway to the Ruahine Range.

In July 2020, the name of the locality was officially gazetted as Āpiti by the New Zealand Geographic Board.

Education

References

Populated places in Manawatū-Whanganui
Manawatu District